Liocrobyla kumatai is a moth of the family Gracillariidae. It is known from Japan, the Russian Far East and Korea.

The wingspan is 6–7 mm.

The larvae feed on Desmodium and Lespedeza species, including Lespedeza bicolor. They mine the leaves of their host plant.

References

Gracillariinae
Moths of Japan
Moths described in 1982